Marius Ioan Bilașco (born 13 July 1981) is a Romanian retired footballer, currently he is the sporting director of CFR Cluj.

Career
In October 2009, he scored his first UEFA Champions League goal in a 4–1 away win against Rangers F.C.

On 31 August 2010, he signed a contract with Steaua București alongside teammates from Unirea Urziceni: Galamaz, Ricardo, Marinescu, Apostol, Onofraş, and Brandán.

International career

International stats

Honours

Club
FC Unirea Urziceni
Liga I: 2008–09

FC Steaua București
Cupa României: 2010–11

References

External links
 
 
 
 

1981 births
Living people
People from Sighetu Marmației
Romanian footballers
Association football forwards
Romania international footballers
FC Argeș Pitești players
FC Politehnica Timișoara players
CS Minaur Baia Mare (football) players
FC Unirea Urziceni players
FC Steaua București players
Tianjin Jinmen Tiger F.C. players
FC Energie Cottbus players
Liga I players
2. Bundesliga players
Romanian expatriate footballers
Expatriate footballers in China
Romanian expatriate sportspeople in China
Expatriate footballers in Germany
Romanian expatriate sportspeople in Germany
Chinese Super League players